Habit (also known as 3rd Album) is the third and final studio album by South Korean singer, U;Nee. It was released on January 26, 2007, on Synnara Music, five days after her death.

Overview
In late 2006, Korean media reported that U;Nee was hard at work on a brand new album, showing a snippet of the song 솔로판타지 (Sorrow Fantasy) and U;Nee rehearsing a dance to it. The album was expected to be released some time in 2007. However, on January 21, it was reported that U;Nee had committed suicide due to a bout with depression. Synnara Music then reported that they would not release U;Nee's third album, as the news of her death was too unbearable. But from constant demand, they decided to release the album as a final gift from U;Nee to her fans, despite prior criticism from netizens. Within 3 days, the album received 5,000 pre-orders, and has sold 51,000 copies by March 1, 2007. All the money made from the album was given to U;Nee's family. The music style of the album is R&B influenced, but there is an electropop dance song ("Honey"), a rock song, which she raps and sings on ("U-Turn"), and a Christmas instrumental ("라스트 크리스마스 1397"). The title song, "Habit", was promoted as a tribute song for U;Nee, and a video in U;Nee's memory came along with it.

Track listing
"Intro" 
"U-Turn" 
"Honey" 
"솔로판타지 (Sorrow Fantasy)" 
"습관 (Habit) (Acoustic Ver.)" 
"내 맘속의 빈자리 (My Empty Heart)"
"Follow Me" 
"Run Away" 
"아버지 (Father) (Remix Ver.)" 
"유턴 (House Ver.)" 
"습관 (Habit) (Ver.2)" 
"라스트 크리스마스 (Last Christmas) 1397"

Promoted songs
"습관 (Acoustic Ver.)"

References

2007 albums
U;Nee albums